Corunastylis leptochila is a small terrestrial orchid endemic to Victoria. It has a single thin leaf fused to the flowering stem and up to twenty small reddish-brown to dark purplish flowers. It is known from one population with only six plants in forest near a swamp.

Description
The flowers and are inverted so that the labellum is above the column rather than below it. There is an oblong callus in the centre of the labellum and extending nearly to its tip. Flowering occurs in November and December.

Taxonomy and naming
Corunastylis leptochila was first formally described in 2017 by David Jones from a specimen collected near Lavers Hill and the description was published in Australian Orchid Research. The specific epithet (leptochila) is derived from the Ancient Greek words leptos meaning "fine" or "small" and cheilos meaning "lip" or "rim".

Distribution and habitat
Corunastylis leptochila grows in forest near a swamp near Lavers Hill where only six plants are known.

References

External links
 

leptochila
Endemic orchids of Australia
Orchids of Victoria (Australia)
Plants described in 2017